The Birmingham Combination was an English football competition for teams in Birmingham and the surrounding areas, which was active from 1892 until 1954. It was founded as the Birmingham & District Junior League, and changed its name in 1908. The league was also affiliated to the Birmingham County F.A. Winners of the league would have had to have been elected to the Birmingham & District League in order to gain promotion.

History
The competition was formed in 1892, three years after the Birmingham & District League, to cater for those clubs which held "junior" membership of the Birmingham County Football Association, and was thus initially called the Birmingham & District Junior League.  The eight founder member clubs were Aston St James, Bournbrook, Bournville, Ellen Street Victoria, Hamstead, Kings Heath Albion, Park Mills, and Soho Villa.

By 1908 the league's status and area of coverage had grown significantly and it changed its name to the Birmingham Combination.  At this time the Combination acted as a "feeder" league to the Birmingham & District League. The Combination attracted the top four teams of the Walsall and District League, Willenhall Swifts, Darlaston, Bilston United and Hednesford Town, as well as Wednesbury Old Athletic, who all moved to the Birmingham Junior League for the beginning of the season.

The league welcomed Walsall as they became the first local Football League club to enter a team in the competition when in 1923 they entered their reserve team, they were followed in 1928 by Birmingham, in 1932 by Wolverhampton Wanderers and in 1933 by West Bromwich Albion. Aston Villa were the last of the local league sides to enter a team, doing so in 1935. By the 1930s it had grown in prestige and had come to be regarded as the stronger of the two leagues.

In 1952 the Birmingham & District League, which had by now regained its status as the top league in the area, suggested a merger between the two competitions, but the Combination rejected the idea.  Several of the Combination's top teams then defected to its rival.  The depleted Combination then revived the idea of a merger but it was rejected and, when all bar one of the Combination's remaining clubs jumped to the League in 1954, the Combination was effectively absorbed by the League.

Champions
The champions of the league were as follows:

References

 
Football in the West Midlands (county)
Defunct football leagues in England
History of Birmingham, West Midlands
West Midlands (Regional) League